PT Bank Maspion Indonesia Tbk is an Indonesian banking and financial services public company established in 1989, and based in Surabaya. It is part of the Maspion group of companies.

See also 
List of banks in Indonesia

References

External links 
 

1989 establishments in Indonesia
2013 initial public offerings
Banks established in 1989
Banks of Indonesia
Companies based in Surabaya
Companies listed on the Indonesia Stock Exchange
Indonesian brands
Indonesian companies established in 1989